Jiří Kavan (11 December 1943 – 14 June 2010) was a Czechoslovak handball player who competed in the 1972 and 1976 Summer Olympics.

He was born in Olomouc, and represented Dukla Praha. He was part of the Czechoslovak team which won the silver medal at the Munich Games. He played all six matches and scored fifteen goals. Four years later he was a member of the Czechoslovak team which finished seventh. He played four matches and scored nine goals.

References

1943 births
2010 deaths
Czech male handball players
Czechoslovak male handball players
Olympic handball players of Czechoslovakia
Handball players at the 1972 Summer Olympics
Handball players at the 1976 Summer Olympics
Olympic silver medalists for Czechoslovakia
Olympic medalists in handball
Medalists at the 1972 Summer Olympics
Sportspeople from Olomouc